The 1939–40 season was Port Vale's 34th season of football in the Football League, and second successive season in the Third Division South. All competitive football was suspended upon the breakout of war in Europe, just two games into the regular season. These two games were expunged form official records and the regional war leagues which replaced them are not recognised by the Football League and thus not included in official records. Port Vale went on to finish eighth in the West League of the regional wartime league.

Overview
Having rebuilt the playing squad the previous season, the Port Vale management opted to supplement the relatively team with young signings; notable teenage arrivals were Scottish winger Murdoch Dickie from Crewe Alexandra and inside-forward Bert Flatley from York City. Ken Fish returned as assistant trainer as well as a player, with the club deciding to do without a manager in favour of a selection committee. A goalless draw on the opening day down at Brighton & Hove Albion was followed by a 1–0 home defeat to Exeter City, but match number three against Northampton Town was cancelled after war was declared and the government prohibited all sports gatherings. The Football League was formally cancelled and the footballing authorities looked at alternative arrangements. Permission was granted for football to take place in Stoke-on-Trent and friendlies took place as during this time.

The Football League eventually decided upon regional leagues and placed Vale in the West Region, alongside the big clubs from Liverpool and Manchester. Attendances were low, with only the fixtures with Manchester United and Everton breaking the 4,000 mark at the Old Recreation Ground. They managed to beat Everton 2–1 in front on a season-high crowd of around 6,000, and also managed to pick up a 1–1 draw with Liverpool in front of just 4,000 spectators at Anfield. Vale suffered heavy defeats at Old Trafford, the Victoria Ground and Maine Road, as well as at home to Liverpool, but managed to record doubles against both Crewe Alexandra and Tranmere Rovers. Despite fielding strong sides in the War Cup and Staffordshire Senior Cup they were eliminated in the opening rounds by Walsall and West Bromwich Albion respectively. Jack Roberts finished as top-scorer with 14 goals in all competitions. The club could not afford to continue fielding a professional team and so fielded just a junior side until the 1944–45 season despite still losing vast sums of money maintaining the Old Recreation Ground.

League table

Third Division South

 Note: The Football League was cancelled after three matches.

West Regional Championship

Results
Port Vale's score comes first

Football League Third Division South

Football League West (War) League

Football League (War) Cup

Staffordshire Senior Cup

Player statistics

Appearances

Top scorers

Transfers

Transfers in

Transfers out

References
Specific

General

Port Vale F.C. seasons
Port Vale